Darwin Michael Semotiuk (February 6, 1945 – January 4, 2022) was a Canadian football coach and professor of kinesiology at the University of Western Ontario. He coached the Western Ontario Mustangs football team from 1975 to 1984 and also served as the university's athletic director for 20 years. He won two Vanier Cup championships, in 1976 and 1977. He was the CIAU Coach of the Year in 1976.

Semotiuk attended the University of Alberta where he played on and captained the basketball and football teams in the 1960s. He was later drafted by the Calgary Stampeders of the CFL and played on the Canadian national men's basketball team. He earned a Ph.D. from Ohio State University. He was added to the University of Alberta's Sports Wall of Fame in 2002. Semotiuk died on January 4, 2022, at the age of 76, from organ failure related to sepsis.

References

1945 births
2022 deaths
Canadian people of Ukrainian descent
Academic staff of the University of Western Ontario
Western Mustangs football coaches
Canadian football people from Edmonton
Deaths from sepsis
Infectious disease deaths in Ontario